Sergiu Natra (12 April 1924 – 23 February 2021) was an Israeli composer of classical music.

Among Natra's creations: Symphony in Red, Blue, Yellow and Green, Horizons Symphony, Invincible Symphony, Tongues of Fire Symphony, Memories Symphony, Future In The Past symphony, The Meaning Of Life Symphony, Earth and Water Symphony, 2020 Symphony, Secrets Symphony, Variations for Piano and Symphony orchestra, Song of Deborah for symphony orchestra and voice, Sacred Service for symphony orchestra.

He was particularly known for his harp compositions, including "Music for Violin and Harp", "Sonatina for Harp", "Prayer for Harp", "Divertimento for Harp flute and Strings orchestra", "Music for Nicanor", "Commentaires Sentimentaux", "Ode To The Harp" and "Trio in One Movement no. 3".

Life and work
Natra was born in Romania as Sergiu Nadler in April 1924 into a Jewish family with Austrian, German and Czech origins. As a child he studied piano and took up music studies in 1932. He continued his studies at the Jewish conservatory until 1942, and graduated from the Music Academy of Bucharest in 1954. He studied, among others, theory, composition and orchestration with Leon Klepper and modern music with Mihail Andricu.

He began composing at an early age and his symphony orchestra composition "March and Choral" earned him the status of a modernist in Romania. The Israel Philharmonic Orchestra performed this work in 1947 under the direction of Edward Lindenberg. Natra received many composition awards in composing classical music, including for creations composed at the age of 19 - "March and Choral" and "Divertimento in ancient style", George Enescu award for composition in 1945 and for creations composed at the age of 25 including "Suite for symphony orchestra" in 1951 when he received the National Prize for Composition.

Natra Sergiu and his family, Holocaust survivors and who were considered part of the "elite", suffered from persecution, forced labor, prison time and confiscation of all their properties. Some of the composer's music creations were not preserved and destroyed.

In 1961, Natra and his wife, Sonia, a sculptor and multidisciplinary artist, emigrated to Israel. A year later, conducted by Sergiu Comissiona, the Israel Philharmonic Orchestra performed the "Horizons Symphony for symphony string orchestra", which was the last piece he had written in Romania, and the "Music for violin and harp", performed by the violinist Miriam Fried and the French harpist Françoise Netter.

Besides composing music, professor Natra taught music, including at Tel Aviv University, where he taught music of the 20th century, composition, and analysis of forms. He was a professor at the Music Academy in the Tel Aviv University (now the Buchmann-Mehta School Of Music) until 1985.

Natra and his wife Sonia, had two sons, Danny and Gabi. He died in February 2021 at the age of 96.

Main works
Natra is a composer with a clear European orientation, who has a clear personal stamp and a particular writing style with melodic flow, atonal language, polyphonic idea, gradual development and shaping of motive material. 
He makes use of a rich palette of sound-colors, unusual instrumental combinations, central registers of instruments (and voices), playing techniques which are natural and comfortable and succeed in producing optimal sound, texts in a new language, with its fresh rhythms and sonorities.

Future In The Past Symphony (1943) for symphony string orchestra 18'
March and Chorale (1943) for symphony orchestra, 11'
The Flood stage music (1944) for the theater work
Laughter and Tears (1944) stage music for the Song of Love of Three Oranges by Carlo Gozzi (in collaboration with Edgar Cosma) 
Way To The Concentration Camp (1944) dance music for the recital of Judith Taussinger dancer
String quartet nr. 1 (1944)
Spacetime Symphony for symphony string orchestra (1944/2017), 3 movements, 40'
Spacetime for string quartet (1945/2017), 3 movements, 20'
Future In The Past Symphony (1945) for symphony string orchestra with piano, 14'
Three Street Cortèges for piano, music for stage (1945) 6'
Four Poems (1945) stage music for reciters, violin and piano, lyrics of Margareta Dorian and Liana Maxi
Fractals for piano (1945), 3 movements, 15'
Forevermore sonata for piano (1947/2018), 4 movements, 24'
Always Symphony for symphony orchestra (1947/2020), 4 movements, 25'
Suite for symphony string orchestra, piano and vibraphone (1947)
The Girl Soldier (1947) poem music for reciter and piano, lyrics by Ilya Ehrenburg 
Music for Children (1947), piano, 5'20i, 7 pieces on Romanian folk tunes
Song for Republic (1948), mixed choir voices and piano for lyrics by Nina Cassian
Spring Song (1948), for children choir with 2 equal voices, lyrics by Letitia Papu
Suite for symphony orchestra (1949), 14'
Earth and Water Symphony for symphony orchestra (1949/2017), 4 movements, 30'
Two pieces for film journals (1950) for orchestra music for film
Symphony for orchestra (1951), 40'
Songs collection (1952)
Existence Symphony for symphony orchestra and baritone (1956), 4 movements, 35'
Existence for baritone & piano (1956), 30', texts: Stefan O. Iosif, Mihai Eminescu, Tudor Arghezi, Emil Isac
Horizons Symphony for symphony string orchestra (1959), 3 movements, 27'
Music for Violin and Harp (1960), 12'
Interlude for Harp (1962),8'
Festive Overture - Toccata and Fuga (1963) for symphony orchestra, 12' 
Sonatina for Harp (1963), 7'
Music for Harpsichord and Six Instruments (1964) harpsichord, flute, clarinet, 2 violas, celloand double bass, 19’ 
Music for Oboe and Strings (1965) oboe  string orchestra,3 movements, 16' 
Variations for piano and symphony orchestra (1966), 22'
Tongues of Fire (1967) Le'shonot ha'esh ballet music in 4 acts for symphony orchestra, 35’
Song of Deborah (1967) Shirat Devorah, voice  orchestra text: Bible: Judges: 5, 17'
Tongues of Fire Symphony(1968) Le'shonot ha'esh, 4 movements, 50'
Prelude and Nehemiah Builds the Second House (1968) choir (SATB), baritone  symphony orchestra, texts: Bible: Apocrypha Book of Nehemiah, in Hebrew, 3 movements, 18' 
Memorial for Harp (1968),8'
Sonatina for Trombone in 5 movements (1969), 11’, solo trombone
Sonatina for Trumpet in 4 movements (1969), 7’, solo trumpet
Prayer (1970) solo harp, 6'
Trio in One Movement nr. 1 (1971) piano trio, 12'
Dedication for voice and symphony orchestra (1972) various passages from Bible Psalms Isaiah, in Hebrew
Book Of Songs for harp (1973/2018) 10 pieces for harp, 25' 
Divertimento for Harp and Strings (1974) string quartet  double bass ad lib., 10'
Sonata Brevis for trombone bass (1974)
Sacred Service (1975), choir (SATB), baritone, soprano, violin, cello, harpand organ, 60’
Sacred Service (1975) 3 choruses organ, choir (SATB), baritone, soprano, violin, cello, harpand organ, 7’
Sacred Service (1975) 2 songs, soprano, piano, 11'
Discoveries (1976) "Entdeckungen" Children’s play for 10 pedal harps, 5 Irish harpsand percussion (3), text: Phia Berghout (Netherland) Sonia & Sergiu Natra, in German, 7' 
Secrets Symphony (1977) for symphony orchestra, 4 movements, 30'
Pages from a Composer's Diary (1978) for orchestra, 4 movements, 15'
Variations (1978) for harpsichord, 13'
Song ofDeborah and Barak (1978), voice  symphony orchestra, text: Bible: Judges: 5, 15'
Sacred Service (1978) for symphony orchestra voice solo and choir 30’
Introduction and three interludes (1978)for symphony orchestra, part of the Sacred Service work
Museum on the Hill (1979) film music for clarinet, French horn, viola, cello, piano, harp, percussionand accordion, 27' recorded, 1979, Jerusalem Film Center, about the Israel Museum in Jerusalem
Invincible Symphony (1981), 4 movements, 25'
Hours (1981) 7 songs for alto, clarinet, violinand piano text: Sonia Natra, 12'
Diary of a Choreographer (1982) ballet music for flute, piano and tape, 30'
Music For Harp and Three Brass Instruments (1983) harp, trumpet, tromboneand French horn, 8'
Miracle of the Peoples (1984) cantata for choir (SATB), soprano, baritone and orchestra, 16'
Divertimento for Harp and String Orchestra (1985), 12'
Divertimento for Harp,Fluteand String Orchestra (1985), 12'
Music for Violin and Piano (1986)
Fantasia for Violoncello and Piano (1987)
Sonatina for Piano (1987)
Developments (1988) viola  orchestra, 12'
Developments (1988) for viola and piano, 12'
To Be Free (Nicanor) (1988) harp, flute, clarinet  string quartet, 13'
Ancient Walls (1990) harp  trombone, 10'
String Quartet No. 2 (1991), 6 movements, 12'
Concerto a quattro (1993) clarinet, trombone, cello, organand string orchestra, 18'
Sonate Dans Un Mouvement Pour Quatre Harpes, four harps, (1993)
Wings for choir (SATB), text: Sonia Natra in Hebrew (1994), 5'
Wings for soprano  piano,text: Sonia Natra in Hebrew (1994), 5'
Ballade Millenaire solo harp (1998),7'
Harmonic Tone Image for two pianos (1998),10'
Reflections on Mordechai Zeira’s Song Two Roses (1998) string quartet, 4'
Sonata in One Movement (1999) harp  string quartet, 15'
Three Poems (2000) Exod, Ricercare, Destin, for voice, text: Sonia Natra
Trio in One Movement nr. 2 (2001) piano trio, 8'
Two Poems (2001) Migration, Ricercare, voice  harp, 6', text: Sonia Natra
Commentaires Sentimentaux (2002) flute, viola and harp
Trio in One Movement nr. 3 (2006) 2 French horns and harp
Variations (2007) harpsichord, 13'
Pages from a Composer's Diary (2008) for symphony orchestra, 16'
Ancient Walls (2008) for French horn and harp, 10'
The Bundle Of Sticks Symphony (2010), 28'
Cantosonata for Harp solo (2011), solo harp, 7'
Sonata for Clarinet (B) and Piano (2011)
Konzertstuck for two Pianos and symphony orchestra (2012), 15'
Future In The Past for/spanpiano in four hands (2012), 12'
Esquisses for flute and piano (2013),11'
A Dialogue with Gabi sonata for piano (2015), 5 movements, 23'
Concert Piece for Two Pianos and Symphony Orchestra (2015), 15'
Music for piano, flute, clarinet, 2 violas, cello and double bass (hs) (2015), 20'
Music for piano, flute, clarinet and string orchestra (hs) (2015), 20'
Symphony in Red, Blue, Yellow and Green for symphony orchestra (2016), 4 movements, 42' 
Espaces Sonores for Harp, Flute and String Orchestra (2016), 18'
Future in the Past for string quintet- two violins, viola, violoncello and double bass (2017),14'
Spacetime for string quintet (1945/2017), 3 movements, 20'
Dimension Continuum for two pianos(2017), 3 movements, 19'
Ode To The Harp (2017), 16'
Séparément Ensemblepour deux harpes (2018), 16'
Occurrences Symphony for symphony orchestra (2017), 3 movements, 25'
Music for two harps and orchestra (ms) (2018), 15'
Music for harp and orchestra (ms) (2018), 14'
Modus Vivendi for piano (2018), 17'
Inter Senses for two pianos (2018), 15'
Figurative Abstract for piano (2018), 3 movements,13'
Three Street Cortèges for concert piano (2018), 3 movements, 11-12'
In Motion for Marimba (2018), 16'
In Motion for two Marimbas (2018), 16'
Abstraction for Marimba (2018), 13'
Toujours sonate pour harpe (2018), 4 movements, 25'
Memories Symphony for symphony orchestra (2019), 6 movements, 50'
Confession for piano (2019), 9'
Duo Piano Symphony, 4 movements (2019), 24'
Future in the Past for piano quintet- two violins, viola, violoncello and piano (2019), 17'
Future in the Past for multi piano (2019),17'
Future in the Past for string quartet (2019), 17'
Everything for harp and string quartet (fp) (2019),16'
Everything for four harps (fp) (2019),16'&
Sounds Spaces for piano and string orchestra(2020), 19'
To Be Free for harp/piano, flute, clarinet  string orchestra / string quartet (mn) (2020), 18'
Sentimental Comments (2020) flute, viola  piano (2020), 11'
Sounds Spaces for piano quintet (2020), 19'
Existence for piano (2020), 30'
Existence for piano and clarinet(2020), 30'
2020 Symphony for string symphony orchestra (2021), 30'
Future in the Past for multi harp (2021), 17'
The Meaning Of Life Symphony for symphony orchestra (2021), 32'
Eye Of The Storm for piano (2021), 12'
Eclipse for harp (2021), 12'
The Rise Of The Phoenix Symphony for symphony orchestra  (2021), 30'

Most of the composers scores were published by NATRA PUBLICATIONS, some by IMI in Tel Aviv and some by Harposphere in Paris.
Part of the composers scores, the respective recordings, books and articles are found also in libraries, such as, Beit Ariela Public Library and Cultural Center (Israel), The National Library of Israel, The library of Congress (USA) and The Harold B. Lee Library (USA).

The main source of the list is the composer's documentation and archive. Additional references are found in:.

References

External links
 Official website

1924 births
2021 deaths
20th-century classical composers
20th-century male musicians
Enescu Prize winners
Israeli composers
Israeli people of Austrian-Jewish descent
Israeli people of Czech-Jewish descent
Israeli people of German-Jewish descent
Jewish classical composers
Male classical composers
Romanian emigrants to Israel
Romanian Jews